Michelle Gerlosky (born March 20, 1983) is an American Paralympic volleyballist.

Biography
Gerlosky was born in Lake Wales, Florida with her right hand and part of her forearm missing. She graduated from University of Georgia and received such honours as the Dean's List, Provost's List and with cum laude. She started competing for Paralympic Games in 2010 where she won one silver and two gold medals. The golds came from Parapan American Championship and the World Cup while the silver one was from World Championship. In 2011 and 2012 respectively she won two gold medals at ECVD Continental Cup which was held in Yevpatoria, Ukraine and Volleyball Masters. She also got another silver medal for her participation at 2012 Paralympic Games in London. In 2011, she was married to Alexander Schiffler who is also a sitting volleyball competitor.

Further reading
 Michelle Gerlosky

References

1983 births
Living people
People from Lake Wales, Florida
Paralympic silver medalists for the United States
Medalists at the 2012 Summer Paralympics
Volleyball players at the 2012 Summer Paralympics
American sitting volleyball players
Women's sitting volleyball players
Paralympic medalists in volleyball
Paralympic volleyball players of the United States